Zheng River is a river of China. It flows into the Xiang River, which is part of the East China Sea basin.

See also
List of rivers in China

References